

Amateur boxing

World boxing championships
 May 14 – 24: 2015 Women's Junior/Youth World Boxing Championships in  Taipei

 Junior:  won both the gold and overall medal tallies.

 Youth:  won both the gold and overall medal tallies.
 September 2 – 13: 2015 Junior World Boxing Championships in  Saint Petersburg
  won five (out of 13) events in these championships.
 October 5 – 15: 2015 AIBA World Boxing Championships in  Doha
  won both the gold and overall medal tallies.

AIBA confederations
 May 15 – 24: 2015 EUBC European Confederation Junior Boxing Championships in  Lviv
 Host nation, won both the gold and overall medal tallies.
 June 7 – 14: 2015 ASBC Asian Confederation Junior Boxing Championships in  Tashkent
 Host nation, won both the gold and overall medal tallies.
 June 25 – 30: 2015 AMBC American Confederation Junior Boxing Championships in  San José, Costa Rica
 46 kg winner:  Abner Figueroa
 48 kg winner:  Taylor Lopez
 54 kg winner:  José Núñez
 57 kg winner:  Eury Cedeño
 75 kg winner:  José Carlos Lopez Quintanilla
 The  won the gold medal tally.  won the overall medal tally.
 August 6 – 15: 2015 ASBC Asian Confederation Women's Boxing Championships in  Wūlánchábù
  won six (out of 10) gold medals in this event.
 August 7 – 15: 2015 EUBC European Confederation Boxing Championships in  Samokov
  won the gold medal tally.  won the overall medal tally. 
 August 15 – 24: 2015 EUBC European Confederation Women's Junior / Youth Boxing Championships in  Keszthely
 Junior:  won both the gold and overall medal tallies.
 Youth: Russia won both the gold and overall medal tallies.
 August 17 – 22: 2015 AMBC American Confederation Boxing Championships in  Vargas
  won seven, out of ten, weight classes in this event.
 August 18 – 24: 2015 AFBC African Confederation Boxing Championships in  Casablanca
  won five, out of ten, weight classes in this event.
 August 26 – September 5: 2015 ASBC Asian Confederation Boxing Championships in  Bangkok
  won the gold medal tally.  won the overall medal tally.
 August 29 – September 1: 2015 OCBC Oceania Confederation Boxing Championships in  Canberra
  won both the gold and overall medal tallies.
 November 20 – 29: 2015 EUBC European Confederation Youth Boxing Championships in  Kołobrzeg
  won both the gold and overall medal tallies.

2016 Summer Olympics
  and  won 3 gold medals each. Brazil won the overall medal tally.

Fencing
 October 4, 2014 – October 25, 2015: 2014–15 FIE events season

FIE World championships
 April 1 – 9: 2015 World Junior and Cadets Fencing Championships in  Tashkent
 Junior Men
 Men's Junior Individual Épée winner:  Hippolyte Bouillot
 Men's Junior Team Épée winners: 
 Men's Junior Individual Foil winner:  Damiano Rosatelli
 Men's Junior Team Foil winners: 
 Men's Junior Individual Sabre winner:  Eli Dershwitz
 Men's Junior Team Sabre winners: 
 Junior Women
 Women's Junior Individual Épée winner:  Coraline Vitalis
 Women's Junior Team Épée winners: 
 Women's Junior Individual Foil winner:  Sara Taffel
 Women's Junior Team Foil winners: 
 Women's Junior Individual Sabre winner:  Caroline Queroli
 Women's Junior Team Sabre winners: 
 Cadet Men
 Men's Cadet Individual Épée winner:  KIM Myeong-ki
 Men's Cadet Individual Foil winner:  Sam Moelis
 Men's Cadet Individual Sabre winner:  KIM Dong-ju
 Cadet Women
 Women's Cadet Individual Épée winner:  Alexandra Predescu
 Women's Cadet Individual Foil winner:  Leonie Ebert
 Women's Cadet Individual Sabre winner:  Olga Nikitina
 July 13 – 19: 2015 World Fencing Championships in  Moscow
  and  won 4 gold medals each. Russia won the overall medal tally.
 October 20 – 25: 2015 World Veterans Fencing Championships in  Limoges
 The  won both the gold and overall medal tallies.

FIE Continental championships
 April 17 – 26: 2015 Pan American Fencing Championships in  Santiago

 The  won both the gold and overall medal tallies.
 June 6 – 11: 2015 European Fencing Championships in  Montreux
Italy won the overall medal tally.
 June 11 – 16: 2015 African Fencing Championships in  Cairo
  won the gold medal tally.  and Tunisia won 15 overall medals each.
 June 25 – 30: 2015 Asian Fencing Championships in 
  won both the gold and overall medal tallies.

FIE Grand Prix
 November 28, 2014 – May 31, 2015: 2014–15 FIE Grand Prix events

Épée
 December 5 – 7, 2014: 2015 Qatar Grand Prix in  Doha
 Men's winner:  Daniel Jerent
 Women's winner:  Simona Gherman
 March 20 – 22: Hungarian Grand Prix in  Budapest
 Men's winner:  Nikolai Novosjolov
 Women's winner:  Shin A-lam
 May 22 – 24: Brazilian Grand Prix in  Rio de Janeiro
 Men's winner:  Yannick Borel
 Women's winner:  Francesca Boscarelli

Foil
 November 28 – 30, 2014: Italian Grand Prix in  Turin
 Men's winner:  Aleksey Cheremisinov
 Women's winner:  Arianna Errigo
 March 13 – 15: Cuban Grand Prix in  Havana
 Men's winner:  Dmitry Rigin
 Women's winner:  Elisa Di Francisca
 May 16 & 17: Chinese Grand Prix in  Shanghai
 Men's winner:  Miles Chamley-Watson
 Women's winner:  Elisa Di Francisca

Sabre
 December 13 & 14, 2014: US Grand Prix in  New York City
 Men's winner:  Kim Jung-hwan
 Women's winner:  Olga Kharlan
 March 28 & 29: Korean Grand Prix in  Seoul
 Men's winner:  Nicolas Limbach
 Women's winner:  Olga Kharlan
 May 30 & 31: Russian Grand Prix in  Moscow
 Men's winner:  Tiberiu Dolniceanu
 Women's winner:  Olga Kharlan

FIE World Cup
 October 17, 2014 – May 3, 2015: 2014–15 Fencing World Cup

Men's Épée
(Individual and Team events)
 October 24 – 26, 2014: Swiss World Cup in  Bern
 Winner:  Jean-Michel Lucenay
 Team winners: 
 November 14 – 16, 2014: Glaive de Tallinn in 
 Winner:  Gauthier Grumier
 Team winners: 
 January 22 – 24: Heidenheimer Pokal in  Heidenheim, Bavaria
 Winner:  Max Heinzer
 Team winners: 
 February 13 – 15: Canadian World Cup in  Vancouver
 Winner:  Ronan Gustin
 Team winners: 
 May 1 – 3: Challenge Monal in  Paris
 Winner:  Alexandre Blaszyck
 Team winners:

Women's Épée
(Individual and Team events)
 October 24 – 26, 2014: Italian World Cup in  Legnano
 Winner:  Anfisa Pochkalova
 Team winners: 
 November 14 – 16, 2014: Chinese World Cup in  Xuzhou
 Winner:  Emese Szász
 Team winners: 
 January 23 – 25: Spanish World Cup in  Barcelona
 Winner:  Xu Anqi
 Team winners: 
 February 13 – 15: Argentinian World Cup in  Buenos Aires
 Winner:  Sarra Besbes
 Team winners: 
 May 1 – 3: South African World Cup in  Johannesburg
 Winner:  Sun Yujie
 Team winners:

Men's Foil
(Individual and Team events)
 October 17 – 19, 2014: American World Cup in  San Francisco
 Winner:  Jérémy Cadot
 Team winners: 
 November 7 – 9, 2014: Prince Takamodo WC in  Tokyo
 Winner:  Race Imboden
 Team winners: 
 January 16 – 18: Challenge International de Paris in 
 Winner:  Race Imboden
 Team winners: 
 February 6 – 8: Löwe von Bonn in 
 Winner:  Andrea Cassarà
 Team winners: 
 May 1 – 3: Fleuret de St-Petersbourg in 
 Winner:  Dmitry Rigin
 Team winners:

Women's Foil
(Individual and Team events)
 October 17 – 19, 2014: Mexican World Cup in  Cancún
 Winner:  Arianna Errigo
 Team winners: 
 November 7 – 9, 2014: French World Cup in  Saint-Maur-des-Fossés
 Winner:  Arianna Errigo
 Team winners: 
 January 16 – 18: The Artus Court PKO BP in  Gdańsk
 Winner:  Astrid Guyart
 Team winners: 
 February 6 – 8: Algerian World Cup in  Algiers
 Winner:  Lee Kiefer
 Team winners: 
 May 1 – 3: Reinhold-Würth-Cup in  Tauberbischofsheim
 Winner:  Elisa Di Francisca
 Team winners:

Men's Sabre
(Individual and Team events)
 November 1 & 2, 2014: Senegalese World Cup in  Dakar
 Cancelled for unknown reasons.
 November 21 – 23, 2014: Hungarian World Cup in  Budapest
 Winner:  Gu Bon-gil
 Team winners: 
 January 31 & February 1: Trophée Luxardo in  Padua
 Winner:  Kamil Ibragimov
 Team winners: 
 February 20 – 22: Sabre de Wolodyjowski in  Warsaw
 Winner:  Gu Bon-gil
 Team winners: 
 May 1 – 3: Spanish World Cup in  Madrid
 Winner:  Gu Bon-gil
 Team winners:

Women's Sabre
(Individual and Team events)
 November 1 & 2, 2014: Venezuelan World Cup in  Isla Margarita
 Winner:  Sofiya Velikaya
 Team winners: 
 November 21 – 23, 2014: Trophée BNP-Paribas in  Orléans
 Winner:  Sofiya Velikaya
 Team winners: 
 January 30 – February 1: Greek World Cup in  Athens
 Winner:  Olha Kharlan
 Team winners: 
 February 21 & 22: Challenge Yves Brasseur in  Ghent
 Winner:  Sofiya Velikaya
 Team winners: 
 May 2 & 3: Chinese World Cup in  Beijing
 Winner:  Sofiya Velikaya
 Team winners:

Wheelchair fencing World Cup & Championships
 May 1 – December 21: 2015 IWASF Wheelchair Fencing World Cup
 May 1 – 3: World Cup #1 in  Montreal
 For results, click here.
 May 22 – 24: World Cup #2 in  Pisa
 For results, click here.
 July 9 – 12: World Cup #3 in  Warsaw
 For results, click here.
 October 22 – 25: World Cup #4 in  Paris
 For results, click here.
 December 14 – 21: World Cup #5 (final) in  Sharjah
 For the U17 results, click here.
 For the U23 results, click here.
 For the World Cup results, click here.
 April 27 – 29: Americas Regional Championships in  Montreal
 For results, click here.
 July 4 – 7: U23 World Cup in  Stadskanaal
 For results, click here.
 September 17 – 24: 2015 IWASF Wheelchair Fencing World Championships in  Eger
 For results, click here.

Other fencing events
 February 3–8: CPE Cadet & Junior American Championships 2015 in  Toronto
** won both the gold and overall medal tallies.
 February 24 – March 5: Fencing EFC Cadet & Junior European Championships 2015 in  Maribor
  won both the gold and overall medal tallies.
 February 28 – March 9: Fencing FCA Cadet & Junior Asian Championships 2015 in  Abu Dhabi

  won both the gold and overall medal tallies.
 March 1–5: Fencing CAE Cadet & Junior African Championships 2015 in  Algiers
**  won both the gold and overall medal tallies.
 April 22–26: Fencing EFC Under 23 European Championships 2015 in  Vicenza

  won both the gold and overall medal tallies.

Judo

World judo championships
 August 5 – 9: 2015 World Cadet Judo Championships in  Sarajevo
  won the gold medal tally.  won the overall medal tally.
 August 24 – 30: 2015 World Judo Championships in  Astana
  won both the gold and overall medal tallies.
 September 21 – 24: 2015 Kata and Veterans World Judo Championships in  Amsterdam
 Nage-no-kata winners:  Michito Sakamoto / Takayuki Yokoyama
 Katame-no-kata winners:  Satoshi Nakayama / Seiji Hayashi
 Juno kata winners:  Megumi Shirano / Hikaru Shirano
 Kime-no-kata winners:  Kenji Takeishi / Koji Uematsu
 Goshin jutsu winners:  Hideki Miyamoto / Masaki Watanabe
 Veterans Day 1 results, click here.
 Veterans Day 2 results, click here.
 Veterans Day 3 results, click here.
 Veterans Day 4 results, click here.
 October 23 – 27: 2015 World Junior Judo Championships in  Abu Dhabi
  won both the gold and overall medal tallies.

Judo Grand Slam
 May 8 – December 6: 2015 Judo Grand Slam events
 May 8 – 10: Grand Slam #1 in  Baku
 July 18 & 19: Grand Slam #2 in  Tyumen
  won the gold medal tally.  won the overall medal tally.
 October 17 & 18: Grand Slam #3 in  Paris
  won both the gold and overall medal tallies.
 October 30 – November 1: Grand Slam #4 in  Abu Dhabi
  won the gold medal tally. The  and  won 6 overall medals each.
 December 5 & 6: Grand Slam #5 (final) in  Tokyo
  won both the gold and overall medal tallies.

Judo Grand Prix
 February 20 – November 28: 2015 Judo Grand Prix events
 February 20 – 22: Grand Prix #1 in  Düsseldorf
  won both the gold and overall medal tallies.
 March 20 – 22: Grand Prix #2 in  Tbilisi
 March 27 – 29: Grand Prix #3 in  Samsun
 Four nations won 2 gold medals each. The  and  won 5 overall medals each.
 May 1 – 3: Grand Prix #4 in  Zagreb
 Four nations won 2 gold medals each.  won the overall medal tally.
 June 13 & 14: Grand Prix #5 in  Budapest
  won the gold medal tally.  won the overall medal tally.
 July 3 – 5: Grand Prix #6 in  Ulaanbaatar
  won both the gold and overall medal tallies.
 October 1 – 3: Grand Prix #7 in  Tashkent
  won the gold medal tally.  won the overall medal tally.
 November 20 – 22: Grand Prix #8 in  Qingdao
  won both the gold and overall medal tallies.
 November 26 – 28: Grand Prix #9 (final) in  Jeju City
  won both the gold and overall medal tallies.

European Judo Union (EJU)
 February 7 – October 11: 2015 European Open events
 February 7 & 8: European Open #1 in  Sofia
*** won both the gold and overall medal tallies.
 February 14 & 15: European Open #2 in  Oberwart (women only)
  won both the gold and overall medal tallies.
 February 14 & 15: European Open #3 in  Rome (men only)
  won both the gold and overall medal tallies.
 February 28: European Open #4 in  Prague (women only)
 Seven different nations won one gold medal each.  and  won 4 overall medals each.
 February 28 & March 1: European Open #5 in  Warsaw (men only)
  won the gold medal tally.
 May 30 & 31: European Open #6 in  Cluj-Napoca
 Four different nations won 2 gold medals each.  and the  won 7 overall medals each.
 June 6 & 7: European Open #7 in  Minsk
  won the gold medal tally.  won the overall medal tally.
 October 10 & 11: European Open #8 (co-final) in  Glasgow (men only)
  and the  won 2 gold medals each.  won the overall medal tally.
 October 10 & 11: European Open #9 (co-final) in  Lisbon (women only)

European Judo Cup
 March 7 – November 1: 2015 European Judo Cup events
 March 7 & 8: European Judo Cup #1 in  Zürich-Uster

  won both the gold and overall medal tallies.
 March 21 & 22: European Judo Cup #2 in  Sarajevo
  won both the gold and overall medal tallies.
 May 16 & 17: European Judo Cup #3 in  Orenburg
  won both the gold and overall medal tallies.
 June 13 & 14: European Judo Cup #4 in  Celje
  won both the gold and overall medal tallies.
 July 11 & 12: European Judo Cup #5 in  London
  won both the gold and overall medal tallies.
 July 18 & 19: European Judo Cup #6 in  Sindelfingen
 The  won the gold medal tally.  won the overall medal tally.
 September 5 & 6: European Judo Cup #7 in  Bratislava
Poland won the overall medal tally.
 September 26 & 27: European Judo Cup #8 in  Belgrade
  won both the gold and overall medal tallies.
 October 3 & 4: European Judo Cup #9 in  Tampere
  won the gold medal tally.  won the overall medal tally.
 October 17 & 18: European Judo Cup #10 in  Dubrovnik
  won both the gold and overall medal tallies.
 October 24 & 25: European Judo Cup #11 in  Lund
  won both the gold and overall medal tallies.
 October 31 & November 1: European Judo Cup #12 (final) in  Málaga
  won both the gold and overall medal tallies.

Pan American Judo Confederation (CPJ)
 March 7 – August 2: 2015 Pan American Open events
 March 7 & 8: Pan American Open #1 in  Santiago
  won both the gold and overall medal tallies.
 March 14 & 15: Pan American Open #2 in  Montevideo
  won the gold medal tally.  won the overall medal tally.
 March 21 & 22: Pan American Open #3 in  Buenos Aires
  won both the gold and overall medal tallies.
 June 27 & 28: Pan American Open #4 (final) in  San Salvador
  won both the gold and overall medal tallies.

African Judo Union (AJU)
 January 17 – November 8: 2015 African Open events
 January 17 & 18: African Open #1 in  Tunis

  won both the gold and overall medal tallies.
 March 14 & 15: African Open #2 in  Casablanca
  won both the gold and overall medal tallies.
 November 7 & 8: African Open #3 (final) in  Port Louis
  won both the gold and overall medal tallies.

Other judo competitions
 April 10 – 12: 2015 Oceania Judo Championships in  Païta, South Province, New Caledonia
 Senior:  won both the gold and overall medal tallies.
 Cadet: Australia won both the gold and overall medal tallies.
 Junior: Australia won both the gold and overall medal tallies.
 April 23 – 25: 2015 Pan American Judo Championships in  Edmonton

  won both the gold and overall medal tallies.
 April 23 – 26: 2015 African Judo Championships in  Libreville

  won the gold medal tally. Tunisia and  won 13 overall medals each.
 May 13 – 17: 2015 Asian Judo Championships in  Kuwait City

  won both the gold and overall medal tallies.
 May 23 & 24: 2015 World Masters Judo Championships in  Rabat
  won both the gold and overall medal tallies.
 May 23 & 24: 2015 European Kata Championships in  Herstal
  and  won 3 gold medals each. Italy won the overall medal tally.
 May 28 – 31: 2015 European Veterans Judo Championships in  Balatonfüred
  won the gold medal tally.  won the overall medal tally.
 June 25 – 28: 2015 European Judo Championships in  Baku (part of the European Games)
 July 3 – 5: 2015 European Cadets Judo Championships in  Sofia
 Individual:  won the gold medal tally. Russia and  won 10 overall medals each.
 Team: Russia and Georgia each won a gold medal each.
 July 25 & 26: Asian Open in  Taipei
  won both the gold and overall medal tallies.
 September 18 – 20: 2015 European Junior Judo Championships in  Oberwart
 The  won the gold medal tally.  won the overall medal tally.
 November 13 – 15: 2015 European U23 Judo Championships in  Bratislava
  and  won 3 gold medals each. Russia won the overall medal tally.
 November 14 & 15: Oceania Open in  Wollongong
  won both the gold and overall medal tallies.
 December 19: 2015 European Club Judo Championships in  Tbilisi
 Men's team winners:  Sagaredjo
 Women's team winners:  JTS NOORD-OOST

Kickboxing

Kunlun Fight

Taekwondo

WTF
 January 16 – December 6: 2015 WTF Open and Other Events Calendar
 January 16 – 18: 2015 Greek Open in  Thessaloniki
 Men's -54 kg winner:  Sotirios Boutios
 Men's -58 kg winner:  Levent Tuncat
 Men's -63 kg winner:  Jaouad Achab
 Men's -68 kg winner:  Anthony Stephenson
 Men's -74 kg winner:  Júlio Ferreira
 Men's -80 kg winner:  Roberto Botta
 Men's -87 kg winner:  Ahmad Mohammadi
 Men's Heavyweight (+87 kg) winner:  Sajjad Mardani
 Women's -46 kg winner:  Kyriaki Kuottouki
 Women's -49 kg winner:  Tijana Bogdanović
 Women's -53 kg winner:  Indra Craen
 Women's -57 kg winner:  Anna-Lena Frömming
 Women's -62 kg winner:  Marta Calvo Gómez
 Women's -67 kg winner:  Ana Bajić
 Women's -73 kg winner:  Iva Radoš
 Women's Heavyweight (+73 kg) winner:  Aleksandra Kowalczuk
Host nation, and  won 7 overall medals each.
 January 20 – 25: 2015 US Open in  Orlando, Florida
 Men's -54 kg winner:  Venilton Teixeira
 Men's -58 kg winner:  Cheng Ching Huang
 Men's -63 kg winner:  Zhao Shuai
 Men's -68 kg winner:  José Antonio Rosillo
 Men's -74 kg winner:  TJ Curry
 Men's -80 kg winner:  Damon Sansum
 Men's -87 kg winner:  Lutalo Muhammad
 Men's Heavyweight (+87 kg) winner:  Abdoula Issoufou Alfaga
 Women's -46 kg winner:  Lin Wan-ting
 Women's -49 kg winner:  Wenren Yuntao
 Women's -53 kg winner:  Huang Yun-wen
 Women's -57 kg winner:  Cheyenne Lewis
 Women's -62 kg winner:  Hua Zhang
 Women's -67 kg winner:  Guo Yunfei
 Women's -73 kg winner:  Reshmie Oogink
 Women's Heavyweight (+73 kg) winner:  Aleksandra Kowalczuk
  won the gold medal tally.
 January 31 & February 1: 2015 Bosnia Open in  Sarajevo
  won both the gold and overall medal tallies.
 February 5 – 7: 2015 Fujairah Open in the 
  won the gold medal tally. Iran and  won 11 overall medals each.
 February 10 & 11: 2015 European Taekwondo Club Championships in  Antalya
  won the gold medal tally. Host nation, won the overall medal tally.
 February 13 – 15: 2015 Turkish Open in  Antalya
 Host nation, won both the gold and overall medal tallies.
 February 13 – 15: 2015 Canada Open in  Toronto
  won both the gold and overall medal tallies.
 February 13 – 15: 2015 Asian Clubs Taekwondo Championships in  Tehran
 Overall club winner:  Shehrdari Varamin
 February 16 – 18: 2015 Fajr Open in  Tehran
  won both the gold and overall medal tallies.
 February 20 – 22: 2015 African Taekwondo Union (AFTU) International Open in  Alexandria
  and  won 4 gold medals each.  won the overall medal tally.
 February 27 – March 1: 2015 Luxor Open in 
  won the gold medal tally.  won the overall medal tally.
 March 6 – 9: 2015 Qatar Open in  Doha (debut event)
  won both the gold and overall medal tallies.
 March 7 & 8: 2015 Swiss Open in  Clarens, Switzerland
 Five nations won 2 gold medals each.  won the overall medal tally.
 March 13 – 15: 2015 Mexican Open in  Aguascalientes
 Host nation, won both the gold and overall medal tallies.
 March 13 – 15: 2015 Dutch Open in  Eindhoven
Iran and  won 4 overall medals each.
 May 29 – 31: 2015 Paraguay Open in  Asunción
  and  won 4 gold medals each. Brazil won the overall medal tally.
 June 5 – 7: 2015 Bolivia Open in  Santa Cruz de la Sierra
  and  won 4 gold medals each.  won the overall medal tally.
 June 26 – 28: 2015 Australian Open in  Melbourne
  won both the gold and overall medal tallies.
 September 3 – 6: 2015 Indonesian Open in  Pekanbaru
 Senior:  won both the gold and overall medal tallies.
 Junior:  won both the gold and overall medal tallies.
 September 6 & 7: 2015 Israel Open in  Ramla
  and  won 3 gold medals each. Russia won the overall medal tally.
 October 25 – 28: 2015 Kazakhstan Open in  Almaty
  won the gold medal tally.  won the overall medal tally.
 March 25 – 29: 2015 European Championships Olympic Weight Categories in  Nalchik

  won the gold medal tally. Host nation, won the overall medal tally.
 April 11 – 14: 2015 Asian Junior Taekwondo and Poomsae Championships in  Taipei

  won both the gold and overall medal tallies.
 April 14 – 16: 2015 Asian Cadet Taekwondo Championships in  Taipei (debut event)

  won both the gold and overall medal tallies.
 August 14 – 16: WTF World Grand Prix Moscow 2015 in 
  won both the gold and overall medal tallies.
 September 11 – 13: 2015 Pan American Open Taekwondo Championships in  Aguascalientes
  won both the gold and overall medal tallies.
 September 18 – 20: WTF World Grand Prix Samsun 2015 in 
  won the gold medal tally.  won the overall medal tally.
 October 8 – 11: 2015 Taekwondo XVII Open Cidade Maravilhosa Internacional in  Rio de Janeiro
  won both the gold and overall medal tallies.
 October 16 – 18: WTF World Grand Prix Manchester 2015 in 
  won the gold medal tally.  and  won 4 overall medals each.
 December 5 & 6: WTF World Grand Prix Mexico City Final 2015 in 
  and  won 2 gold medals each.  won the overall medal tally.

WTF World Championships
 May 12 – 18: 2015 World Taekwondo Championships in  Chelyabinsk

  won the gold medal tally.  won the overall medal tally.
 Men's overall team point winners: 
 Women's overall team point winners: 
 August 23 – 26: 2015 WTF World Cadet Taekwondo Championships in  Seolcheon-myeon, Muju County
  won both the gold and overall medal tallies.

WTF Para-Taekwondo championships
 April 17: 2015 Asian Para-Taekwondo Championships in  Taipei (debut event)
  won both the gold and overall medal tallies.
 April 20: 2015 European Para-Taekwondo Championships in  Chișinău
  won both the gold and overall medal tallies.
 September 15 – 17: 2015 WTF World Para-Taekwondo Championships in  Samsun
 For results, click here.

Wrestling
 January 3 – December 18: 2015 United World Wrestling Calendar of Events

January WRL
 January 3 & 4: Nordhagen Classic 2015 in  Calgary
 Junior Women's Freestyle: The  won the gold medal tally.  and the United States won 7 overall medals each. 
 Senior Women's Freestyle: Canada won both the gold and overall medal tallies.
 January 10: XXXVI Herman Kare 2015 in  Kouvola
 Greco-Roman:  won the gold medal tally. Host nation, won the overall medal tally.
 January 22 – 26: Golden Grand Prix Ivan Yarygin 2015 in  Krasnoyarsk
 Men's Freestyle:  won both the gold and overall medal tallies.
 Women's Freestyle: Russia won both the gold and overall medal tallies.
 January 28 – 31: Dave Schultz Memorial 2015 in  Colorado Springs, Colorado
 Men's Freestyle: The  won both the gold and overall medal tallies.
 Women's Freestyle: The United States won both the gold and overall medal tallies.
 Greco-Roman:  won the gold medal tally. The United States won the overall medal tally.
 January 29 & 30: Yadegar Imam Cup 2015 in  Mashhad
 Cadet Men's Freestyle:  won both the gold and overall medal tallies.
 Cadet Greco-Roman: Iran won both the gold and overall medal tallies.

February WRL
 February 6 & 7: 24th Flatz Open in  Wolfurt
 Junior Men's Freestyle:  won the gold medal tally.  won the overall medal tally.
 Cadet Men's Freestyle:  won the gold medal tally. Poland won the overall medal tally.
 Junior Women's Freestyle:  won the gold medal tally. Poland won the overall medal tally.
 February 6 – 8: Aarhus Open 2015 in 
 Junior Greco-Roman: The  and  won 2 gold medals each. Host nation, won the overall medal tally.
 Cadet Greco-Roman: The Czech Republic and  won 3 gold medals each. The Czech Republic won the overall medal tally. 
 February 11 – 15: Granma y Cerro Pelado 2015 in  Havana
 Men's Freestyle: The  won both the gold and overall medal tallies.
 Women's Freestyle: The United States won both the gold and overall medal tallies.
 Greco-Roman: Host nation, won both the gold and overall medal tallies.
 February 12 & 13: Takhti Cup 2015 in  Kermanshah
 Men's Freestyle:  won both the gold and overall medal tallies.
 Greco-Roman:  and Iran won both 3 gold medals each. Iran won the overall medal tally.
 Pahlavani +90 kg winner:  Jaber Sadeghzadeh
 February 13 – 15: Klippan Lady Open 2015 in  Klippan, Scania
 Senior Women's Freestyle:  won both the gold and overall medal tallies.
 Cadet Women's Freestyle:  won both the gold and overall medal tallies.
 February 27 & 28: Austrian Open 2015 in  Götzis
 Junior Greco-Roman:  won both the gold and overall medal tallies.

March WRL
 March 5 – 7: Medved 2015 in  Minsk
 Men's Freestyle: Host nation, and  won 2 gold medals each. Belarus won the overall medal tally.
 Women's Freestyle: Host nation, Belarus, won the gold medal tally. Russia won the overall medal tally.
 March 6 – 8: Petko Sirakov and Ivan Iliev 2015 in  Sofia
 Junior Men's Freestyle:  won the gold medal tally. Host nation, won the overall medal tally.
 Junior Women's Freestyle:  won the gold medal tally. Bulgaria won the overall medal tally.
 Junior Greco-Roman:  won both the gold and overall medal tallies.
 March 7 & 8: Roman Dmitriyev Memorial 2015 in  Yakutsk
 Junior Men's Freestyle:  won both the gold and overall medal tallies. (Note: Russia won all 8 gold medals in this event.)
 March 14: Thor Masters 2015 in  Nykøbing Falster
 Greco-Roman:  won the gold medal tally.  and Germany won 4 overall medals each.
 March 14 & 15: Prix of the Buryatia Republic's President 2015 in  Ulan-Ude
 Men's Freestyle: Host nation, won the gold medal tally.  won the overall medal tally.
 March 27 – 29: Mongolia Open 2015 in  Ulaanbaatar
 Men's Freestyle: Host nation, won both the gold and overall medal tallies.
 Women's Freestyle: Mongolia won both the gold and overall medal tallies.
 March 28 & 29: V. Freidenfelds Cup 2015 in  Riga
 Junior Men's Freestyle:  won both the gold and overall medal tallies.
 Junior Women's Freestyle:  won both the gold and overall medal tallies.
 Junior Greco-Roman: Georgia won both the gold and overall medal tallies.
 March 28 & 29: Yaşar Doğu 2015 in  Istanbul
 Men's Freestyle:  won the gold medal tally.  and Russia won 8 overall medals each.

April WRL
 April 4 & 5: Vehbi Emre & Hamit Kaplan 2015 in  Istanbul
 Greco-Roman: Host nation, won both the gold and overall medal tallies.
 April 11: Croatia Open 2015 in  Zagreb
 Cadet Greco-Roman:  won both the gold and overall medal tallies.
 April 11 & 12: Abdelaziz Oueslati Memorial 2015 in  Tunis
 Men's Freestyle:  won the gold medal tally. Host nation, won the overall medal tally.
 Greco-Roman:  won the gold medal tally. Tunisia won the overall medal tally.
 April 16 – 19: Azerbaijan Wrestling Federation Cup 2015 in  Baku
 Junior Men's Freestyle:  won both the gold and overall medal tallies.
 Junior Greco-Roman: Azerbaijan won the gold medal tally. Azerbaijan and  won 9 overall medals each.
 Cadet Men's Freestyle: Azerbaijan and  won 4 gold medals each. Azerbaijan won the overall medal tally.
 Cadet Greco-Roman:  won the gold medal tally. Azerbaijan won the overall medal tally.
 April 24 – 26: Dan Kolov & Nikola Petrov 2015 in  Sofia
 Men's Freestyle:  won both the gold and overall medal tallies.
 Women's Freestyle:  and  won 2 gold medals each. Bulgaria, Turkey, and  won 5 overall medals each.
 Greco-Roman: Bulgaria won both the gold and overall medal tallies.
 April 24 – 26: Adriatic Trophy 2015 in  Poreč
 Junior Greco-Roman:  and  won 2 gold medals each.  won the overall medal tally.

May WRL
 May 2 & 3: Mukhran Vakhtangadze 2015 in  Batumi
 Junior Greco-Roman:  won both the gold and overall medal tallies.
 May 9: Ljubomir Ivanović Gedza 2015 in  Belgrade
 Greco-Roman:  won both the gold and overall medal tallies.
 May 9: Macedonian Pearl 2015 in  Radoviš
 Men's Freestyle:  won both the gold and overall medal tallies.
 May 16 & 17: Olympia 2015 in  Olympia
 Men's Freestyle:  won the gold medal tally.  won the overall medal tally.
 Women's Freestyle:  and  won 3 gold medals each. Canada won the overall medal tally.
 Greco-Roman: Moldova won the gold medal tally.  won the overall medal tally.
 May 16 & 17: Jovenes Promesas 2015 in  San Javier, Murcia
 Junior Men's Freestyle:  won both the gold and overall medal tallies.
 Junior Women's Freestyle: Canada and  won 3 gold medals each. Canada and  won 7 overall medals each. 
 Junior Greco-Roman:  and Spain won 2 gold medals each. Spain won the overall medal tally.
 Cadet Men's Freestyle: Italy won the gold medal tally. Canada won the overall medal tally.
 Cadet Women's Freestyle: Canada and Spain won 4 gold medals each. Spain won the overall medal tally.
 Cadet Greco-Roman: Spain won both the gold and overall medal tallies.
 May 22 – 24: Mithat Bayrak & İsmet Atlı 2015 in  Antalya
 Junior Men's Freestyle:  and  won 3 gold and 12 overall medals each.
 Junior Women's Freestyle: Russia won both the gold and overall medal tallies.
 Junior Greco-Roman: Turkey won both the gold and overall medal tallies.
 May 23 & 24: Nordic Championship 2015 in  Bodø
 Women's Freestyle:  won all the gold medals and have won the overall medal tally, too.
 Greco-Roman:  won both the gold and overall medal tallies.
 Junior Greco-Roman: Sweden and  won 2 gold medals each. Sweden and  won 5 overall medals each.
 Cadet Women's Freestyle: Sweden won both the gold and overall medal tallies.
 Cadet Greco-Roman: Norway and Sweden won 3 gold medals each. Finland won the overall medal tally.
 May 30: Milone Trophy Matteo Pellicone Memorial 2015 in  Sassari
 Greco-Roman:  won the gold medal tally.  won the overall medal tally.
 May 30: Sassari City Matteo Pellicone Memorial 2015 in  Sassari
 Men's Freestyle:  won both the gold and overall medal tallies.
 Women's Freestyle:  won both the gold and overall medal tallies.
 May 30 & 31: Asashoryu Cup 2015 in  Ulaanbaatar
 Cadet Men's and Women's Freestyle:  won both the gold and overall medal tallies in these two categories.

June WRL
 June 4 – 6: Pat Shaw Memorial 2015 in  Guatemala City
 Junior Men's Freestyle:  won both the gold and overall medal tallies.
 Junior Greco-Roman:  won the gold medal tally. Guatemala won the overall medal tally.
 Cadet Men's Freestyle: Guatemala won both the gold and overall medal tallies.
 Cadet Greco-Roman: Guatemala won both the gold and overall medal tallies.
 June 6: Brandenburg Cup 2015 in  Frankfurt / Oder
 Junior Greco-Roman:  won both the gold and overall medal tallies.
 June 13: Canada Cup 2015 in  Guelph
 Men's Freestyle:  won both the gold and overall medal tallies.
 Women's Freestyle: Canada won both the gold and overall medal tallies.

July WRL
 July 3 – 5: Ali Aliyev 2015 in  Kaspiysk
 Men's Freestyle:  won both the gold and overall medal tallies.
 July 4: Refik Memišević Brale 2015 in  Subotica
 Cadet Greco-Roman:  and  won 3 gold medals each. Hungary won the overall medal tally.
 July 18 & 19: Stepan Sargsyan Cup 2015 in  Yerevan
 Men's Freestyle:  won the gold medal tally. Armenia and  won 9 overall medals each.
 July 18 & 19: Ion Cornianu & Ladislau Șimon 2015 in  Bucharest
 Men's Freestyle:  and  won 3 gold medals each. Germany won the overall medal tally.
 Women's Freestyle:  won both the gold and overall medal tallies.
 Greco-Roman: Romania won the gold medal tally. Germany won the overall medal tally.
 July 24 – 26: Poland Open, Ziółkowski & Pytlasinski 2015 in  Warsaw
 Men's Freestyle:  won the gold medal tally.  won the overall medal tally.
 Women's Freestyle:  and  won 2 gold medals each.  won the overall medal tally.
 Greco-Roman:  won both the gold and overall medal tallies.
 July 24 – 26: Kazakhstan President Cup 2015 in  Astana
 Team Men's Freestyle Results
 Gold:  Team #1; Silver: ; Bronze: Kazakhstan Team #2
 Team Women's Freestyle Results
 Gold: Kazakhstan Team #1; Silver: ; Bronze: Mongolia
 Team Greco-Roman Results
 Gold: ; Silver: Kazakhstan Team #1; Bronze:

October WRL
 October 2 – 4: Dmitry Korkin 2015 in  Yakutsk
 Men's Freestyle:  won both the gold and overall medal tallies.
 October 9 – 11: Bolat Turlykhanov Memorial 2015 in  Semey
 Greco-Roman:  won both the gold and overall medal tallies.
 October 9 – 11: Ramzan Kadirov of Adlan Varaev 2015 in  Grozny
 Men's Freestyle:  won both the gold and overall medal tallies.
 October 16 – 18: Intercontinental Cup 2015 in  Khasavyurt
 Men's Freestyle:  won all the gold medals and won the overall medal tally, too.
 October 23 – 25: Republic Cup 2015 in  Istanbul
 Junior Men's Freestyle:  won the gold medal tally.  won the overall medal tally.
 Junior Greco-Roman:  won the gold medal tally. Turkey won the overall medal tally. 
 October 24: Kristjan Palusalu Memorial 2015 in  Tallinn
 Greco-Roman:  won both the gold and overall medal tallies.
 October 29 & 30: Martyrs Cup 2015 in  Tehran
 Junior Men's Freestyle
 Winners: 
 Second:  
 Third: 
 Junior Greco-Roman
 Winners: 
 Second: 
 Third:

November WRL
 November 6 & 7: NYAC / Bill Farrell 2015 in  New York City
 Men's Freestyle: The  won both the gold and overall medal tallies.
 Women's Freestyle:  won both the gold and overall medal tallies.
 Greco-Roman: The United States won both the gold and overall medal tallies.
 November 6 – 8: Open Cup of European Nations, Alrosa Cup 2015 in  Moscow
 Men's Freestyle:  won all the gold medals.  won all the silver medals.  won all the bronze medals.
 Women's Freestyle: Russia won all the gold medals.  won all the silver medals.  won all the bronze medals.
 Greco-Roman: Russia won all the gold medals. Azerbaijan won all the silver medals.  won all the bronze medals.
 November 19 & 20: Oleg Karavayev 2015 in  Minsk
 Greco-Roman:  won all the gold medals.  won all the rest of the medals.
 November 21: Vantaa Cup 2015 in 
 Greco-Roman:  won both the gold and overall medal tallies.
 November 21 & 22: Ibrahim Moustafa 2015 in  Sharm el-Sheikh
 Men's Freestyle:  won all the gold medals and won the overall medal tally, too.
 Greco-Roman: Egypt won both the gold and overall medal tallies.
 November 26 & 27: World Wrestling Clubs Cup 2015 #1 in  Mazandaran
 Men's Freestyle:  Bimeh Razi Joubary
 November 27 & 28: 41st Henri Deglane Challenge 2015 in  Nice
 Men's Freestyle:  and the  won 2 gold medals each. Romania and  won 5 overall medals each.
 Women's Freestyle:  won the gold medal tally. Romania won the overall medal tally.
 November 27 – 29: Kunayev D.A. 2015 in  Taraz
 Men's Freestyle:  won the gold medal tally.  won the overall medal tally.
 November 28: Arvo Haavisto 2015 in  Ilmajoki
 Greco-Roman:  won the gold medal tally.  won the overall medal tally.

December WRL
 December 5 & 6: Haparanda Cup 2015 in 
 Greco-Roman:  and  won 4 gold medals each. Sweden won the overall medal tally.
 December 11 & 12: Brazil Cup 2015 in  Rio de Janeiro
 Women's Freestyle:  won almost every medal here.
 Greco-Roman: Brazil won almost every medal here.

World wrestling championships
 August 11 – 16: 2015 World Junior Wrestling Championships in  Salvador, Bahia
 Junior Men's Freestyle:  won the gold medal tally.  won the overall medal tally.
 Junior Women's Freestyle:  won both the gold and overall medal tallies.
 Junior Greco-Roman:  won both the gold and overall medal tallies.
 August 25 – 30: 2015 World Cadet Wrestling Championships in  Sarajevo
 Cadet Men's Freestyle:  won both the gold and overall medal tallies.
 Cadet Women's Freestyle:  won the gold medal tally. Japan and Russia won 8 overall medals each.
 Cadet Greco-Roman:  won the gold medal tally. Russia won the overall medal tally.
 September 7 – 12: 2015 World Wrestling Championships in  Las Vegas
  and the  won 4 gold medals each. Russia won the overall medal tally.
 October 13 – 18: 2015 World Veterans Wrestling Championships in  Athens
 Go to this event's UWW's web page to get detailed results.

Wrestling World Cups
 February 19 & 20: 2015 Greco-Roman World Cup in  Tehran
  defeated , 4–4 in matches played and by the score of 18–17 in classification points, for first place.  took third place. 
 March 7 & 8: 2015 Women's Freestyle World Cup in  Saint Petersburg
  defeated Russia, 5–3 in matches played, for first place.  took third place.
 April 11 & 12: 2015 Men's Freestyle World Cup in  Los Angeles
Azerbaijan took third place.

Wrestling Grand Prix
 January 31 & February 1: 2015 Grand Prix of Paris in 
 Men's Freestyle:  won the gold tally. Iran and  won 6 overall medals each.
 Women's Freestyle:  won both the gold and overall medal tallies.
 Greco-Roman:  won the gold medal tally. Azerbaijan and  won 5 overall medals each.
 February 21 & 22: 2015 Grand Prix Zagreb Open in 
 Greco-Roman:  won both the gold and overall medal tallies.
 March 7 & 8: 2015 Hungarian Grand Prix in  Szombathely
 Greco-Roman:  won both the gold and overall medal tallies.
 May 23 & 24: 2015 Grand Prix of Germany in  Dormagen
 Women's Freestyle:  and  won 2 gold medals each. Russia won the overall medal tally.
 Cadet Women's Freestyle: Russia won both the gold and overall medal tallies.
 July 11 & 12: 2015 Grand Prix of Spain in  Madrid
 Men's Freestyle: The  won both the gold and overall medal tallies.
 Women's Freestyle:  won both the gold and overall medal tallies.
 Greco-Roman:  won both the gold and overall medal tallies.
 November 27 – 29: 2015 Golden Grand Prix in  Baku
 Men's Freestyle:  won both the gold and overall medal tallies.
China, Russia, and  won 4 overall medals each.
 Greco-Roman: Azerbaijan won both the gold and overall medal tallies.

Continental wrestling championships
 March 20 – 22: 2015 Oceania Wrestling Championships in  Majuro
Senior
 Men's Freestyle:  and  won 3 gold medals each. The  won the overall medal tally.
 Women's Freestyle: The Marshall Islands took 2 gold medals.  won one gold medal.
 Greco-Roman: Australia won the gold medal tally. The  won the overall medal tally.
Junior
 Junior Men's Freestyle:  and Palau won 2 gold medals each. The Marshall Islands and the Federated States of Micronesia won 4 overall medals each.
 Junior Women's Freestyle: The Marshall Islands' wrestler, Ilania Keju, was the only woman competitor here.
 Junior Greco-Roman:  won the gold medal tally. The Marshall Islands, Palau, and the Federated States of Micronesia won 3 overall medals each.
Cadet
 Cadet Men's Freestyle: The Marshall Islands won the gold medal tally. The Marshall Islands and the Federated States of Micronesia won 3 overall medals each. 
 Cadet Women's Freestyle: There were only two Guamanian women competitors here.
 Cadet Greco-Roman: The Marshall Islands won the gold medal tally. The Marshall Islands and the Federated States of Micronesia won 3 overall medals each. 
 March 24 – 29: 2015 European U23 Wrestling Championship in  Wałbrzych
 Men's Freestyle:  won both the gold and overall medal tallies.
 Women's Freestyle: Russia won both the gold and overall medal tallies.
 Greco-Roman:  and Russia won 2 gold medals each. Russia won the overall medal tally.
 April 18 & 19: 2015 Mediterranean Wrestling Championship in  Madrid
 Men's Freestyle:  and  won 4 gold medals each. Spain won the overall medal tally.
 Women's Freestyle: Spain won both the gold and overall medal tallies.
 Greco-Roman: Spain won both the gold and overall medal tallies.
 Cadets Men's Freestyle: Spain won both the gold and overall medal tallies.
 Cadets Women's Freestyle: Spain won both the gold and overall medal tallies.
 Cadets Greco-Roman:  won the gold medal tally.  won the overall medal tally.
 April 24 – 26: 2015 Pan American Wrestling Championships in  Santiago
 Men's Freestyle: The  won both the gold and overall medal tallies.
Canada won the overall medal tally.
 Greco-Roman: Cuba won the gold medal tally. Cuba and the United States won 6 overall medals each.
 May 6 – 8: 2015 Pan American Junior Wrestling Championships in  Havana
 Junior Men's Freestyle: The  won the gold medal tally.  won the overall medal tally.
 Junior Women's Freestyle: The United States won the gold medal tally. Cuba and the United States won 7 overall medals each.
 Junior Greco-Roman: Cuba won both the gold and overall medal tallies.
 May 6 – 10: 2015 Asian Wrestling Championships in  Doha

 Men's Freestyle:  won the gold medal tally. Iran and  won 7 overall medals each.
 Women's Freestyle:  and Japan won 4 gold medals each. Japan won the overall medal tally.
 Greco-Roman: Iran won both the gold and overall medal tallies.
 May 27 – 31: 2015 African Wrestling Championships in  Alexandria
 Men's Freestyle:  won the gold medal tally. Egypt and  won 6 overall medals each.
 Women's Freestyle: Egypt, and  won 2 gold medals each.  and Tunisia won 5 overall medals each.
 Greco-Roman: Egypt won both the gold and overall medal tallies. 
 June 11 – 14: 2015 Asian Cadet Wrestling Championships in  New Delhi
 Cadet Men's Freestyle:  won the gold medal tally. India and  won 7 overall medals each.
 Cadet Women's Freestyle:  won both the gold and overall medal tallies.
 Cadet Greco-Roman:  won the gold medal tally. Iran won the overall medal tally.
 June 23 – 28: 2015 European Junior Wrestling Championships in  Istanbul
 Junior Men's Freestyle:  won both the gold and overall medal tallies.
 Junior Women's Freestyle: Russia won the gold medal tally.  won the overall medal tally.
 Junior Greco-Roman: Azerbaijan won the gold medal tally.  won the overall medal tally. 
 July 3 – 5: 2015 Pan American Cadet Wrestling Championships in  Guadalajara
 Cadet Men's Freestyle: The  won both the gold and overall medal tallies.
 Cadet Women's Freestyle:  won both the gold and overall medal tallies.
 Cadet Greco-Roman: The United States won the gold medal tally. Mexico and the United States won 10 overall medals each.
 July 9 – 12: 2015 Asian Junior Wrestling Championships in  Naypyidaw
 Junior Men's Freestyle:  won the gold medal tally.  won the overall medal tally.
 Junior Women's Freestyle:  won both the gold and overall medal tallies.
 Junior Greco-Roman: India, Iran, and  won 2 gold medals each. Kazakhstan won the overall medal tally.
 August 4 – 9: 2015 European Cadet Wrestling Championships in  Subotica
 Cadet Men's Freestyle:  and  won 3 gold medals each. Georgia won the overall medal tally.
 Cadet Women's Freestyle:  won the gold medal tally. Russia won the overall medal tally.
 Cadet Greco-Roman: Russia won both the gold and overall medal tallies.
 October 4 & 5: 2015 Arab Junior Wrestling Championships in  El Jadida
 Junior Men's Freestyle:  and  won 3 gold medals each. Morocco won the overall medal tally.
 Junior Greco-Roman: Jordan and Morocco won 3 gold medals each. Morocco and  won 7 overall medals each.
 October 7 & 8: 2015 Arab Senior Wrestling Championships in  El Jadida
 Men's Freestyle:  won both the gold and overall medal tallies.
 Greco-Roman: Morocco won both the gold and overall medal tallies.
 October 23 – 25: Balkan Championships 2015 in  Bursa (debut event)
 Cadet Men's Freestyle:  won both the gold and overall medal tallies.
 Cadet Women's Freestyle: Turkey and  won 4 gold medals each. Turkey won the overall medal tally.
 Cadet Greco-Roman: Turkey won both the gold and overall medal tallies.
 November 13 – 15: 2015 South American Championship in  Buenos Aires
 Men's Freestyle:  won both the gold and overall medal tallies.
 Women's Freestyle:  won the gold medal tally. Argentina won the overall medal tally.
 Greco-Roman: Brazil won both the gold and overall medal tallies.

References

Combat sports
combat
Test events for the 2016 Summer Olympic and Paralympic Games